José Francisco Torín Vallés (born 14 August 1999) is a Venezuelan footballer who plays as a defender for Venezuelan Primera División side Zulia FC.

Club career
Torín made his senior debut in a 1–2 league defeat by Estudiantes de Mérida, becoming the first Zulia debutante of 2017.

Career statistics

Club

References

1999 births
Living people
Sportspeople from Maracaibo
Venezuelan footballers
Association football defenders
Zulia F.C. players
Venezuelan Primera División players
21st-century Venezuelan people